USS LST-458 was a United States Navy  used in the Asiatic-Pacific Theater during World War II.

Construction
LST-458 was laid down on 18 September 1942, under Maritime Commission (MARCOM) contract, MC hull 978, by  Kaiser Shipyards, Vancouver, Washington; launched on 26 October 1942; and commissioned on 10 February 1943.

Service history
During the war, LST-458 was assigned to the Pacific Theater of Operations. She took part in the Eastern New Guinea operations, the Lae occupation in September 1943, and the Saidor occupation in February 1944; the Bismarck Archipelago operations, the Cape Gloucester, New Britain, landings from December 1943 through February 1944, and the Admiralty Islands landings in March 1944; the Hollandia operation in April 1944; the Western New Guinea operations, the Toem-Wakde-Sarmi area operation in May 1944, the Biak Islands operation in June 1944, the Noemfoor Island operation in July 1944, the Cape Sansapor operation in August 1944, and the Morotai landing in September 1944; the Leyte landings in October and November 1944; and the Mindanao Island landings in  April 1945.

Post-war service
Following the war, LST-458 performed occupation duty in the Far East until mid-October 1945. Upon her return to the United States, she was decommissioned on 15 April 1946, and struck from the Navy list on 3 July 1946. On 31 October 1947, the ship was sold to the Luria Steel & Trading Corp., of Philadelphia, Pennsylvania, and subsequently scrapped.

Honors and awards
LST-458 earned six battle stars for her World War II service.

Notes 

Citations

Bibliography 

Online resources

External links

 

LST-1-class tank landing ships
World War II amphibious warfare vessels of the United States
1942 ships
S3-M2-K2 ships
Ships built in Vancouver, Washington